Kryts (Kryc) is a Samur language of the Northeast Caucasian language family spoken in parts of the Quba Rayon of Azerbaijan by 6,000 people in 1975. Its dialects are Kryts, Jek, Khaput, Yergyudzh, and Alyk, which are all quite distinct to the point of only partial mutual intelligibility, therefore they could also be considered separate languages in a dialect continuum.

Kryts is endangered, classified as "severely endangered" by UNESCO's Atlas of the World's Languages in Danger.

Phonology

Consonants 

 /ʁ/ may also be realized as [ɢ] or [qː], in complementary distribution.
 Sounds /t͡s, d͡z/ only occur in other dialects of the language.
 An /h/ may vary from a glottal sound to an epiglottal fricative /ʜ/.

Vowels 

 /i/ can be heard as [ɨ], in free variation
 The four vowels may also be pharyngealized as /iˤ, uˤ, eˤ, aˤ/.

References 
Authier, Gilles. 2009. Grammaire kryz. Paris: Peeters.

External links
Kryts basic lexicon at the Global Lexicostatistical Database

Northeast Caucasian languages
Languages of Azerbaijan
Endangered Caucasian languages
Kryts